Louis Deniset (June 29, 1919 – August 26, 1983) was a Liberal Party of Canada member for Saint Boniface, Manitoba, from October 14, 1957, to February 1, 1958.

Early life 
Deniset was born in St. Boniface, Manitoba, on June 29, 1919, to François Deniset and Rachel Bernier. He attended Collège universitaire de Saint-Boniface and later the University of Manitoba, where he gained a Bachelor of Arts and a Bachelor of Laws. During World War II Deniset served as an officer of the Royal 22e Régiment and from 1954 to 1957 he served as a lieutenant-colonel of the Winnipeg Grenadiers. Having married Jeanne Remillard in April 1951, Deniset returned to St. Boniface and established a law practice there. Before his entry on the political scene, he served as L'Association d'education des canadiens français du Manitoba.

Political career 
In 1957 Prime Minister of Canada Louis St. Laurent called an early election for June 10, confident of victory after twenty-two years of Liberal Party government. Deniset was successful in his attempt to run for the district of Saint Boniface and began his term as a member of the House of Commons of Canada in opposition to a minority Conservative Party government. St. Laurent resigned the leadership of the Liberal party and a new leader, Lester Pearson, was appointed. Pearson made the decision to call for the new Prime Minister John Diefenbaker's resignation, and Diefenbaker called an early election. Deniset lost his seat in the March 31, 1958, general election, having served a term of 9 months, 21 days.

Deniset died on August 26, 1983, at age 64.

Election results

References

External links
 

1919 births
1983 deaths
Franco-Manitoban people
Liberal Party of Canada MPs
Members of the House of Commons of Canada from Manitoba
People from Saint Boniface, Winnipeg
Politicians from Winnipeg